Michael R. Berthold is a German computer scientist, entrepreneur, academic and author. He is a professor, and chair for bioinformatics and information mining at Konstanz University, and an honorary professor at Óbuda University. He is also the co-founder of KNIME, and is serving as a president and CEO of KNIME AG since 2017.

Berthold has authored over 250 publications while focusing his research on usage of machine learning methods for the interactive analysis of large information repositories. He is the editor and co-author of textbooks, including, Guide To Intelligent Data Science, and Intelligent Data Analysis.

Berthold is a Fellow of the Institute of Electrical and Electronics Engineers (IEEE), the past president of the North American Fuzzy Information Processing Society, and past president of the IEEE Systems, Man, and Cybernetics Society. He is an associate editor of Data Mining and Knowledge Discovery (DMKD), Knowledge and Information Systems (KIS), Journal of Cheminformatics (JCIS), and International Journal of Computational Intelligence in Bioinformatics and Systems Biology (IJCIBSB). He has been involved in the organization of various conferences, most notably the IDA-series of symposia on Intelligent Data Analysis.

Early life and education
Berthold was born in 1966 in Stuttgart, Germany. He received his MSc degree in computer science in 1992, and his Dr.rer.nat. degree in 1997, both from Karlsruhe University.

Career
Berthold started his academic career as a visiting researcher at Carnegie Mellon University in 1991. He then held appointments as a visiting researcher at the University of Sydney in 1994, and as a researcher at the University of Karlsruhe in 1993. From 1997 till 2000, he was a BISC Research Fellow and lecturer at the University of California, Berkeley. Since 2003, he is a full professor, and chair for bioinformatics and information mining at Konstanz University, Germany. In 2017 he took a leave of absence to become full-time CEO at KNIME AG, Zurich, Switzerland.

At IEEE, Berthold served as a president of the IEEE System, Man, and Cybernetics Society from 2010 till 2011.

Research
Berthold has focused his research on large, and heterogeneous data sources, with particular focus on methods from AI (rule learning, neural networks, fuzzy logic and general machine learning).

Fuzzy models
Berthold has published on methods to extract fuzzy models from data based on constructive methods to build probabilistic neural networks. He developed similar algorithms for the extraction of fuzzy rule models. He then extended those models beyond classification and invented algorithms to extract regression models, so-called fuzzy graphs from data automatically.

Bisociative knowledge discovery
At Konstanz University, Berthold initiated a European project (EU FP7 BISON) that focused on bisociative methods to create insights from diverse data sources. The consortium created output summarized in the resulting edited volume Bisociative Knowledge Discovery.

Widening of machine learning algorithms
Berthold was the first to introduce the idea of widened machine learning which draws on parallel resources to improve model accuracy rather than the usual focus on speed-up. He discussed a number of generic ways of tuning data mining algorithms while providing a series of experiments. Later on, he conducted an in-depth analysis of the concept of Widened Data Mining, which aims at reducing the impact of heuristics by exploring more than just one suitable solution at each step.

In 2017, Berthold and his team proposed the bucket selector, a model-independent randomized selection strategy, with the capability to perform better than existing selection strategies in cases without a diversity measure.

Awards and honors
2001 – KS Fu Award, North American Fuzzy Information Processing Society
2010 – Fellow, The Institute of Electrical and Electronics Engineers (IEEE)
2011 – honorary professor, Óbuda University, Budapest

Bibliography

Selected books
Advances in Intelligent Data Analysis – Reasoning about Data (1997) ISBN 9783540408130
Intelligent Data Analysis 2nd Edition (2007) 9783540430605	
Bisociative Knowledge Discovery (2012) ISBN 9783642318306
Guide To Intelligent Data Science (2020) ISBN 9783030455736

Selected articles
Berthold, M., & Diamond, J. (1994). Boosting the performance of rbf networks with dynamic decay adjustment. Advances in neural information processing systems, 7.
Berthold, M. R., & Huber, K. P. (1998). Missing values and learning of fuzzy rules. International Journal of Uncertainty, Fuzziness and Knowledge-Based Systems, 6(02), 171–178.
Berthold, M. R., & Huber, K. P. (1999). Constructing fuzzy graphs from examples. Intelligent Data Analysis, 3(1), 37–53.
Eliceiri, K. W., Berthold, M. R., Goldberg, I. G., Ibáñez, L., Manjunath, B. S., Martone, M. E., ... & Carpenter, A. E. (2012). Biological imaging software tools. Nature methods, 9(7), 697–710.
Berthold, M. R., Fillbrunn, A., & Siebes, A. (2021). Widening: using parallel resources to improve model quality. Data Mining and Knowledge Discovery, 35(4), 1258–1286.

References 

Living people
German computer scientists
Fellow Members of the IEEE
Year of birth missing (living people)